Luisel Ramos Arregui (April 12, 1984 – August 2, 2006) was a Uruguayan model.

Biography
Ramos was born in La Unión, a middle-class neighborhood in Montevideo, the daughter of former footballer Luis Ramos, who played for the Uruguay national team at the 1966 FIFA World Cup in England and Elsa Arregui, an athlete and gym teacher. Her sister Eliana Ramos was also a model.

Personal life

Death
On August 2, 2006, at 9:15 p.m., Ramos died of heart failure caused by anorexia nervosa while participating in a fashion show during the Montevideo Fashion Week. Ramos had felt ill after walking the runway and subsequently fainted on her way back to the dressing room. She died at the age of 22. Ramos' father told police that she had gone "several days" without eating. She was reported to have adopted a diet of lettuce and Diet Coke for the three months before her death. At the time of her death, she had a body mass index (BMI) of just 14.5. She weighed 44 kg (96.8 lbs) at a height of 1.75 m (5 ft 9 in). The World Health Organization classifies a BMI of under 16 as severe thinness. Her remains are buried at Cementerio del Buceo, Montevideo.

In the wake of Ramos' death, the Madrid Fashion Week (held in September 2006) set a minimum BMI of 18 for all models. In December that year, Italian fashion designers banned size zero models from walking down their catwalks.

On February 13, 2007, Luisel's 18-year-old sister Eliana Ramos, also a model, died at her grandparents' home in Montevideo of an apparent heart attack, believed to be related to malnutrition.

See also
List of deaths from anorexia nervosa

References

External links
 News article: Model Luisel Ramos dies on the catwalk
 Model dies on catwalk

1984 births
2006 deaths
People from Montevideo
Uruguayan female models
Deaths from anorexia nervosa
Neurological disease deaths in Uruguay
Burials at Cementerio del Buceo, Montevideo